The 17th Defense Systems Evaluation Squadron is an inactive United States Air Force unit.  It was last assigned to the 24th Air Division of Aerospace Defense Command at Malmstrom AFB, Montana.   It was inactivated on 13 July 1979.

The squadron was first activated during World War II at Wheeler Field, Territory of Hawaii.  It provided gunnery training to fighter aircraft of Seventh Air Force until being inactivated in the post war reduction of the United States military.

The squadron was again activated under Air Defense Command (ADC) at Vincent Air Force Base, Arizona in 1955 as an element of the 4750th Air Defense Wing.  It moved with the wing to MacDill AFB, Florida in 1959, where it was inactivated when ADC concentrated its fighter weapons training at Tyndall AFB, Florida.

History

Tow Target
The squadron was first activated during World War II at Wheeler Field, Territory of Hawaii.  It provided gunnery training to fighter aircraft of Seventh Air Force until being inactivated in the post war reduction of the United States military.  For its "resourcefulness and efficiency" the unit was awarded the Meritorious Unit Commendation.  After April 1946, the squadron flew very few missions as it prepared for inactivation.

The squadron was again activated under Air Defense Command (ADC) at Vincent Air Force Base, Arizona in 1955 as an element of the 4750th Air Defense Group.  At Vincent it flew aerial targets for the 4750th's mission of providing air-to-air gunnery training for pilots of interceptor aircraft assigned to ADC.  It earned an Air Force Outstanding Unit Award for its performance through 1957.

When the group was discontinued in 1958, the 17th was reassigned directly to the 4750th Air Defense Wing.  It moved with the wing to MacDill AFB, Florida in 1959, where it was inactivated when ADC concentrated its fighter weapons training at Tyndall AFB, Florida, where drone aircraft were used for air-to-air rocket training in ADC's more advanced aircraft.

Radar Evaluation

The predecessor of the 17th Defense Systems Evaluation Squadron as a radar evaluation unit was the 4677th Radar Evaluation Flight (ECM), which was organized at Hill AFB, Utah in 1954.  The peacetime mission of the flight was to provide electronic countermeasure (ECM) training and evaluation services to the aircraft control and warning squadrons assigned to Air Defense Command (ADC).  The squadron also had a wartime mission to provide jamming support for attack aircraft.

In order to provide the necessary training, the flight was initially assigned TB-29 Superfortresses and some TB-25 Mitchells. The B-29s and B-25s carried an assortment of active and passive radar jamming devices to provide the ECM training.  A Douglas C-47 was used as a support aircraft to ferry personnel and equipment. During the period that the 4677th operated these aircraft, they provided ADC radar squadrons with thousands of hours of ECM training. On 8 July 1958 ADC redesignated the unit as the 4677th Radar Evaluation Squadron, ECM.

By 1959 the World War II era aircraft were expensive to operate.  The planes needed excessive amounts of maintenance to remain airworthy and were not supportable due to a lack of spare parts.

The  Martin B-57 Canberra, originally purchased as a medium bomber for tactical bombardment was being phased out of tactical operations in favor of the North American F-100 Super Sabre.  Twelve of these aircraft were reassigned to the squadron.  They were equipped with an assortment of ECM devices and redesignated as EB-57Es.  These were used as faker target aircraft against Convair F-102 Delta Dagger and Convair F-106 Delta Dart interceptors.   The squadron also participated in numerous training exercises such as Feudal Indian, Vigilant Overview, and Feudal Keynote.

The unit also worked in conjunction with the Semi Automatic Ground Environment (SAGE) DC-20 Direction Center at Malmstrom. The SAGE building was built for $6 million in the late 1950s for the automation of air defense and direction of interceptors against unknown aircraft.  Recognizing that its mission now included the evaluation of automated defense systems, the unit was renamed the 4677th Defense Systems Evaluation Squadron in 1960. The squadron was twice awarded with AFOUAs for its performance of this mission.

By 1974, ADC had inactivated the rest of its flying radar evaluation units and wanted to replace the 4677th, which was a Major Command controlled (MAJCON) unit with and Air Force controlled (AFCON) squadron, whose history could be continued if it were inactivated.  As a result, the 4677th was inactivated and the 17th Defense Systems Evaluation Squadron was activated in its place.  The continuity between the units was shown when the 17th decided to retain the 4677th's patch, changing only the number in the scroll.

The squadron remained active until 1979 when it was inactivated as part of the reduced need for aerial evaluation of military radars as the Joint Surveillance System utilizing radars shared with the Federal Aviation Administration began to replace military radars.

Lineage
17th Defense Systems Evaluation Squadron
 Constituted as the 17th Tow Target Squadron ca. 10 November 1943
 Activated on 4 December 1943
 Inactivated ca. 30 September 1946
 Activated on 8 January 1955
 Inactivated on 15 June 1960
 Redesignated as the 17th Defense Systems Evaluation Squadron 8 March 1974
 Activated on 1 July 1974
 Inactivated on 13 July 1979

4677th Defense Systems Evaluation Squadron
 Designated and organized as 4677th Radar Evaluation Flight (ECM) on 18 March 1954
 Redesignated 4677th Radar Evaluation Squadron, ECM on 8 July 1958
 Redesignated 4677th Defense Systems Evaluation Squadron on 1 January 1960
 Inactivated on 1 July 1974

Assignments
17th Defense Systems Evaluation Squadron
 Seventh Air Force, 4 December 1943
 VII Fighter Command, 1944
 7th Fighter Wing, April 1944
 Air Control Group, 7th Fighter Wing (Provisional), September 1944
 7th Fighter Wing, September 1944 – ca. 30 September 1946
 4750th Air Defense Group, 8 January 1955
 4750th Air Defense Wing, 1 October 1958 – 15 June 1960
 24th Air Division, 1 July 1974 – 13 July 1979

4677th Defense Systems Evaluation Squadron
 Central Air Defense Force, 18 March 1954
 29th Air Division, 1 January 1960
 28th Air Division, 1 July 1961
 Fourth Air Force, 1 April 1966
 Tenth Air Force, 15 September 1969
 Aerospace Defense Command, 15 November 1969
 24th Air Division, 2 October 1972 – 1 July 1974

Stations
17th Defense Systems Evaluation Squadron
 Wheeler Field, 4 December 1943 – ca. 30 September 1946
 Vincent AFB, Arizona, 8 January 1955
 MacDill AFB, Florida, 11 June 1959 – 15 June 1960
 Malmstrom AFB, Montana. 1 July 1974 – 13 July 1979

4677th Defense Systems Evaluation Squadron
 Hill AFB, Utah, 18 March 1954
 Malmstrom AFB, Montana, 31 August 1972 – 1 July 1974

Aircraft
 Consolidated B-24 Liberator, 1944
 TB-29 Superfortress, 1954–1959
 TB-25 Mitchell, 1954–1959
 B-57B (later EB-57E) Canberra, 1959–1974; 1974–1979

Awards

See also
 List of United States Air Force defense systems evaluation squadrons
 List of B-29 units of the United States Air Force

References

Notes

Bibliography

  
 
 
 AF Pamphlet 900-2, Unit Decorations, Awards and Campaign Participation Credits Department of the Air Force, Washington, DC, 15 Jun 1971
 AF Pamphlet 900-2, Unit Decorations, Awards and Campaign Participation Credits, Vol II Department of the Air Force, Washington, DC, 30 Sep 1976
 Malmstrom AFB History
 Air Force Historical Research Agency Factsheet, 24th Air Division

External links
 Great Falls Tribune.com: 25 years after NORAD, Great Falls back on radar, By Eric Newhouse, Tribune Projects Editor, June 29, 2008

0017
Military units and formations established in 1943
Military units and formations established in 1954
1943 establishments in Hawaii
1979 disestablishments in Montana